Alexandra Hill is a subzone within the planning area of Bukit Merah, Singapore, as defined by the Urban Redevelopment Authority (URA). Its boundary is made up of Alexandra Road in the north and west; the Ayer Rajah Expressway (AYE) in the south; Lengkok Bahru, Jalan Tiong, Tiong Bahru Road and Tanglin Road in the east.

References

Bukit Merah
Central Region, Singapore